Bhanuben Babariya is a Member of Legislative assembly from Rajkot Rural constituency in Gujarat for the 12th and 13th Gujarat Legislative Assembly.

References

Living people
Gujarat MLAs 2007–2012
Gujarat MLAs 2012–2017
Bharatiya Janata Party politicians from Gujarat
Year of birth missing (living people)